Krzysztof Maria Globisz (born 16 January 1957 in Siemianowice Śląskie) is a Polish theatre and film actor. His best-known role is as Piotr Balicki, the newly qualified barrister whose opinion of capital punishment undergoes a radical change in A Short Film About Killing (1988) directed by Krzysztof Kieślowski.

Selected filmography
 All That Really Matters (1992)

External links
 

1957 births
Living people
People from Siemianowice Śląskie
Polish male actors
Knights of the Order of Polonia Restituta
Recipients of the Silver Medal for Merit to Culture – Gloria Artis
Recipient of the Meritorious Activist of Culture badge